Krapfia is a genus of plants in the family Ranunculaceae, native to the Andes.

Species 
Currently recognized species in Krapfia are:
 Krapfia clypeata (Ulbr.) Standl. & J.F.Macbr.
 Krapfia gigas (Lourteig) Tamura
 Krapfia grace-servatiae Trinidad & W. Mend.
 Krapfia gusmanni (Kunth) Standl. & J.F.Macbr. 
 Krapfia haemantha (Ulbr.) Tamura, 
 Krapfia lechleri (Schltdl.) Standl. & J.F. Macbr.
 Krapfia macropetala (DC.) Tamura
 Krapfia polystycha (Lourteig) Tamura
 Krapfia ranunculina DC.
 Krapfia weberbaueri (Ulbr.) Standl. & J.F. Macbr.

References 

Ranunculaceae genera